Ross Clark (born 30 August 1953) is an Australian poet. His poems often use strongly physical imagery and he is a strong exponent of haiku poetry.

Life
Born in Toowoomba, Clark attended Mt Gravatt High School and the University of Queensland. He spent over a decade teaching in rural and regional communities. In recent years he has specialized in teaching poetry and creative writing at Queensland University of Technology, as well as performing as a musician.

Critical recognition
In 1990 Clark was an inaugural member of the Queensland Writers Train; in 2003 he was recipient of the Centenary of Federation Medal, otherwise known as the Centenary Medal, for "contribution to poetry"; in 2004 he was recipient of the Queensland Writers' Centre Johnno Award, "for outstanding contribution to Queensland writers and writing"; and in 2008 he was recipient of the Australian Book Review Poetry Prize.

Works
1982. Chameleon: Triprych 1-33. Brisbane: Queensland Community Press
1986. With Fires on Every Horizon. Kelvin Grove: Brisbane College of Advanced Education. 
1997. Wishbones & windfalls. Flaxton: Post Pressed. 
2001. Remix: Poems Ancient and Modern. Flaxton: Post Pressed, 
2007. Salt Flung into the Sky. Charnwood: Ginninderra Press.

References

External links
 Expert Guide Listing

1953 births
Australian poets
English-language haiku poets
Living people
Academic staff of Queensland University of Technology
University of Queensland alumni
People from Toowoomba
Recipients of the Centenary Medal
Writers from Brisbane